Five Points is the name of many places in the U.S. state of Pennsylvania:
 Five Points, Adams County, Pennsylvania
 Five Points, Beaver County, Pennsylvania
 Five Points, Berks County, Pennsylvania
 Five Points, Bucks County, Pennsylvania, an area in Levittown, Pennsylvania
 Five Points, Butler County, Pennsylvania
 Five Points, Chester County, Pennsylvania
 Five Points, Clarion County, Pennsylvania
Five Points, Clearfield County, Pennsylvania
Five Points, Columbia County, Pennsylvania
Five Points, Elk County, Pennsylvania
Five Points, Erie County, Pennsylvania
Five Points, Indiana County, Pennsylvania
Five Points, Luzerne County, Pennsylvania
Five Points, Mercer County, Pennsylvania
Five Points, Montgomery County, Pennsylvania
Five Points, Northampton County, Pennsylvania
Five Points, Northumberland County, Pennsylvania
Five Points, Potter County, Pennsylvania
Five Points, Venango County, Pennsylvania
Five Points, Westmoreland County, Pennsylvania